The York Region District School Board (YRDSB), until 1999, English-language Public District School Board No. 16 is the English-language public school board for the Regional Municipality of York in Ontario, Canada. The York Region District School Board is the province's third-largest school board after Toronto's TDSB and Peel's PDSB, with an enrollment of over 122,000 students. It is in the fastest-growing census division in Ontario and the third-fastest growing in Canada.

The public francophone (Conseil scolaire Viamonde), English Catholic (York Catholic District School Board), and French Catholic (Conseil scolaire de district catholique Centre-Sud) communities of York Region also have their own publicly funded school boards and schools that operate in the same area.

History
The school board was officially known as the York Region Board of Education until it changed its name in 1998 to York Region District School Board. Prior to 1971 it was called York County School Board (evolved from 1871 School Act which replacing earlier school acts in merging elementary schools (known as public schools) with higher education (collegiate Institutes and high schools that formed from Grammar School Act of 1807 and Common School Act of 1850). It was later renamed to York Region Board of Education and renamed to English-language Public District School Board No. 16 in 1998 before adopting the current York Region District School Board name in 1999.

Governance
The YRDSB is governed by an elected board of trustees, whose election coincides with the municipal elections in Ontario held throughout the province every four years. The Board consists of 12 trustees, divided amongst the constituent municipalities based on population. Two student trustees are elected by students of the board. The student trustees facilitate communication between students and the school board. The Chair and Vice-Chair of the Board are chosen by secret ballot of the trustees at the inaugural meeting in November.

For day-to-day operations the most senior staff member of the board is the Director of Education, to whom the Associate Director and all of the Superintendents report. The Interim Director of Education is Scott Yake (since November 1, 2022).

Programs
Besides the curriculum established by the Government of Ontario, the York Region District School Board places heavy emphasis on its Character Matters program. As well, due to the multicultural nature, and large immigrant population of students under the YRDSB, the Board established the Race Relations Advisory Committee, a standing committee of the board to advise the trustees on issues related to ethnocultural relations. The committee is made up of trustees, staff, community members and students.

Divisions
The school board is divided into four Community Education Centres (North, Central, East and West). The centres represent communities as follows:
 North: Georgina; Whitchurch-Stouffville, and East Gwillimbury; Newmarket;
 Central: Aurora and King; Richmond Hill (2 trustees); and Vaughan;
 East: East Gwillimbury and Whitchurch-Stouffville; Markham (3 trustees)
 West: Maple; Vaughan; Woodbridge; Thornhill (2 trustees).

The school board teaches approximately 70,000 elementary and 40,000 secondary school students.

Lists of schools

Secondary schools
The school board currently manages 34 facilities that provide secondary education.

Elementary and intermediate schools
The school board currently manages 175 facilities which provides elementary education.

Aurora
Aurora Grove 
Aurora Heights PS
Aurora Senior PS (now Wellington PS)
Devins Drive PS
George Street PS (now Wellington PS)
Hartman PS
Highview PS
Lester B. Pearson PS
Northern Lights PS
Regency Acres PS
Rick Hansen PS
Wells Street PS
Wellington PS (Formerly Aurora Senior PS)
Unnamed  (Hartwell Way)

East Gwillimbury

Holland Landing PS
Mount Albert PS
Park Avenue PS
Queensville PS
Robert Munsch PS (in Mount Albert)
Sharon Public School
Phoebe Gilman Public School

Georgina
Black River PS
Deer Park PS
Fairwood PS
Georgina Island Building
Jersey PS (JK–8)
Keswick PS
Lake Simcoe PS
Lakeside PS
Morning Glory PS
R.L. Graham PS
Sutton PS
W.J. Watson PS

King
Kettleby PS
King City PS
Nobleton Junior PS
Nobleton Senior PS
Schomberg PS

Markham
Aldergrove PS
Armadale PS
Ashton Meadows PS
Baythorn PS
Bayview Fairways PS
Bayview Glen PS
Beckett Farm PS
Black Walnut PS
Boxwood PS
Buttonville PS
Castlemore PS
Cedarwood PS
Central Park PS
Coledale PS
Coppard Glen PS
Cornell Village PS
David Suzuki PS
Donald Cousens PS
E.J. Sand PS
Edward T. Crowle PS
Ellen Fairclough PS
Franklin Street PS (originally Markham Village PS or Markham PS)
German Mills PS
Greensborough PS
Henderson Avenue PS
Highgate PS
James Robinson PS
John McCrae PS
Johnsview Village PS
Legacy PS
Lincoln Alexander PS
Little Rouge PS
Markham Gateway PS
Milliken Mills PS
Mount Joy PS
Nokiidaa PS
Parkland PS
Parkview PS
Ramer Wood PS
Randall PS
Reesor Park PS
Roy H. Crosby PS
Sam Chapman PS
Sir Wilfrid Laurier PS
Stonebridge PS
Stornoway Crescent PS
Unionville Meadows PS
Unionville PS
Unnamed ES (Angus Glen)
Unnamed ES (Greensborough  3)
Unnamed ES (Wismer No. 4 Southwest)
Wilclay PS
William Armstrong PS
William Berczy PS
Willowbrook PS
Wismer PS
Woodland PS

Newmarket
Alexander Muir PS
Armitage Village PS
Bogart PS
Clearmeadow PS
Crossland PS
Denne PS
Glen Cedar PS
J.L.R. Bell PS
Maple Leaf PS
Mazo de la Roche PS
Meadowbrook PS
Poplar Bank PS
Prince Charles PS
Rogers PS
Stonehaven ES
Stuart Scott PS
Terry Fox PS
Unnamed ES (Newmarket Southeast)

Richmond Hill
Adrienne Clarkson PS
Bayview Hill ES
Beverley Acres PS
Charles Howitt PS
Crosby Heights PS
Doncrest PS
Frank Puskas PS
H.G. Bernard PS
Kettle Lakes PS
Lake Wilcox PS
MacLeod's Landing PS
Michaëlle Jean PS
Moraine Hills PS
O.M. MacKillop PS
Oak Ridges PS
Pleasantville PS
Red Maple PS
Redstone PS
Richmond Rose PS
Roselawn PS
Ross Doan PS
Silver Pines PS
Silver Stream PS
Sixteenth Avenue PS
Tom Needham PS
Trillium Woods PS
Unnamed ES (Oak Ridges East No. 1)
Unnamed ES (Oak Ridges East No. 3)
Unnamed ES (Oak Ridges West No. 2)
Walter Scott PS
Windham Ridge PS

Vaughan
Anne Frank PS
Bakersfield PS
Blue Willow PS
Brownridge PS
Carrville Mills PS
Charlton PS
Discovery PS
Dr. Roberta Bondar PS
Elder's Mills PS
Forest Run Public School
Fossil Hill Public School
Glen Shields PS
Glen Gould PS
Joseph A. Gibson PS
Julliard PS
Kleinburg PS
Lorna Jackson PS
Louis-Honore Frechette PS
Mackenzie Glen PS
Maple Creek PS
Michael Cranny ES
Pierre Berton PS
Pine Grove PS
Roméo Dallaire PS
Rosedale Heights PS
Teston Village PS
Thornhill PS
Thornhill Woods PS
Unnamed ES (Block 11 North)
Unnamed ES (Block 11 South)
Unnamed ES (Block 11 No. 3)
Unnamed ES (Block 12 South)
Unnamed ES (Block 18 North)
Unnamed ES (Block 39 West)
Unnamed ES (Block 40)
Vellore Woods Public School
Ventura Park PS
Westminster PS
Wilshire ES
Woodbridge PS
Yorkhill ES

Whitchurch-Stouffville
Ballantrae PS
Barbara Reid PS
Glad Park PS (accepted students from Dickson Hill PS in Markham in September 2002)
Harry Bowes PS
Oscar Peterson PS
Summitview PS
Wendat Village PS
Whitchurch Highlands PS

Georgina Island

YRDSB provides assistance to Chippewas of Georgina Island First Nation and serves the schooling needs for students in grades 7 to 11.

Controversies
In May 2017, the YRDSB was faced with a lawsuit. The board settled a human rights complaint with a parent who had been called the "N-word" by Nancy Elgie, a former board trustee. A Ministry of Education review found a "culture of fear" and "systemic discrimination" at the school board.

See also

 York Catholic District School Board (English Catholic)
 Conseil scolaire catholique MonAvenir (French Catholic) 
 Conseil scolaire Viamonde (French secular)
List of school districts in Ontario
List of high schools in Ontario

References

External links

York Region District School Board
Student Trustees' information